Fédérale 2 is a rugby union club championship division in France. It is the sixth division of rugby above Fédérale 3. Teams can earn promotion to Fédérale 1, and subsequently, to the National 2 and Nationale leagues, and on to the professional leagues such as Rugby Pro D2 and the Top 14.

Results
1996-1997 : US Tours
2001-2002 : AC Bobigny 93 Rugby
2002-2003 : Cahors Rugby
2003-2004 : Paris Université Club
2004-2005 : CSM Gennevilliers
2005-2006 : US Nafarroa
2006-2007 : Valence-d'Agen
2007-2008 : US Carcassonne
2008-2009 : Avenir Castanéen
2009-2010 : Blagnac
2010-2011 : Stade Phocéen
2011-2012 : Vienne

Current teams

Pool 1

Pool 2

Pool 3

Pool 4

Pool 5

Pool 6

Pool 7

Pool 8

External links
Rugby Fédéral

4